Muthalamada is a Grama Panchayat near to Kollengode town in the Palakkad district of Kerala, India. It is a local government organisation that serves the villages of Muthalamada-I and Muthalamada-II. Muthalamada Panchayat is one of the largest Mango Producing area and only the ' Mango City' since 1985. The climate and soil is very suitable for Mango groving.Mainly exports to UAE and Northern States. Nearest Railway Station is Muthalamada between Pollachi and Palakkad Jn. PARAMBIKULAM wild life sanctuary also in this Panchayat. It is famous for Kannimara Teak wood and wild life safari.

Image Gallery

References 

Gram panchayats in Palakkad district
Muthalamada (gram panchayat)